Leandro Vissotto Neves (born 30 April 1983) is a Brazilian volleyball player, a member of Brazil men's national volleyball team and Brazilian club EMS Taubaté Funvic. Vissotto is a winner silver medalist of the Olympic Games London 2012, World Champion 2010, silver medalist of the 2014 World Championship, bronze medalist of the 2011 World Cup, multimedalist of the World League, 2015 Japanese Champion, 2018 Brazilian Superliga Champion and MVP of final .

Personal life
Vissotto was born in Rio de Janeiro, Brazil. He is married to Nathalia. In August 2010 his wife gave birth to their first child, a daughter named Catharina. On September 7, 2013 their second daughter, Victoria, was born in Belo Horizonte.

Career

National team
On October 10, 2010 Brazil, including Vissotto, won a title of World Champion 2010. On August 12, 2012 Vissotto and his team mates lost in the final of Olympic Games with Russia (2-3) and achieved a silver medal, although Vissotto missed the final due to injury. On September 21, 2014 his national team lost with Poland in final of the World Championship 2014 (1-3) and Vissotto achieved his second medal of World Championship, this time it was silver.

Sporting achievements

Clubs

CEV Champions League
  2008/2009 - with Itas Diatec Trentino
  2009/2010 - with Itas Diatec Trentino

FIVB Club World Championship
  Qatar 2009 - with Itas Diatec Trentino

AVC Asian Club Championship
  2016 - with Al Arabi Qatar

National championships
 2005/2006  Brazilian Championship, with Minas Tênis Clube
 2008/2009  Italian Championship, with Itas Diatec Trentino
 2009/2010  Italian Cup, with Itas Diatec Trentino
 2009/2010  Italian Championship, with Itas Diatec Trentino
 2010/2011  Brazilian Championship, with Vôlei Futuro
 2012/2013  Russian Championship, with Ural Ufa
 2014/2015  Japanese Championship, with JT Thunders
 2018/2019  Brazilian Superliga, with Funvic Taubaté

National team
 2000  CSV U19 South American Championship
 2000  FIVB U19 World Championship
 2001  FIVB U21 World Championship
 2009  FIVB World League
 2009  South American Championship
 2009  FIVB World Grand Champions Cup
 2010  FIVB World League
 2010  FIVB World Championship
 2011  FIVB World League
 2011  FIVB World Cup
 2012  Olympic Games
 2013  FIVB World League
 2013  South American Championship
 2014  FIVB World League
 2014  FIVB World Championship

Individually
 2008 Serie A1 - Best Scorer
 2010 Coppa Italia - Final Four Most Valuable Player
 2016 Asian Club Championship - Best Middle Blocker

References

External links

 Leandro Vissotto Neves at the International Volleyball Federation
 
 
 
 

1983 births
Living people
Brazilian people of Italian descent
Volleyball players from Rio de Janeiro (city)
Brazilian men's volleyball players
Olympic volleyball players of Brazil
Volleyball players at the 2012 Summer Olympics
Olympic medalists in volleyball
Olympic silver medalists for Brazil
Medalists at the 2012 Summer Olympics
Ural Ufa volleyball players
Opposite hitters